Light pollution is the presence of unwanted artificial light that brightens the night sky. Improperly shielded lights are the source of many of the issues regarding the light pollution in Hawai'i. Urban centers in the cities are often so bathed in light that over a hundred kilometers from the city's edge, the light pollution resulting from the glow is present. This type of lighting is when some or all of the light goes straight up to space, instead of down to the ground or onto objects, and gets wasted. Dark night skies are an important natural, cultural, scientific, educational, and economic resource for Hawai‘i. There is a heightened risk on the dark sky because of urban lighting that lights up the night sky.

Effects

Effects on astronomy 
The dark night sky has a scientific importance for astronomy research and viewing.

Urban sky glow is taking away the view of the stars and night sky that was so common to the ancestors of the land. In the city of Honolulu, only about 20 stars can be seen on the nightly, and in places with a dark night sky, up to 2,000 stars can be seen nightly. Hawai'i has two major astronomical observatories and the dark sky is immensely important for the telescopes to be able to see faint objects in space. The dark night sky over the island of Hawai'i, is a known tourist attraction with over 100,000 visitors every year. The visitors come to watch the night sky and participate in the stargazing program at the Mauna Kea observatory. Mauna Kea's sky is one of the darkest in the world.

Disruption of the ecosystem 
Light pollution is notably significant for the wildlife living in and around Hawai'i. It has been determined to affect both fauna and flora. Research on wildlife has shown the damage that light pollution does to them. It can alter behaviors and breeding cycles in animals living throughout the island. In Hawai'i, there are some sea turtle and marine bird species that are on the endangered lists and artificial light exceptionally affects them by disorienting them. This frequently leads to the wildlife being injured or killed, which affects their populations. Artificial light on the beaches where sea turtles are known to lay their eggs is harmful to both the females who lay the eggs and the baby sea turtles when they hatch. The bright beaches are discouraging to the female who used to be comfortable nesting on the beach. The newly hatched sea turtles get distracted by the artificial lights and move towards the light instead of making their way to the ocean, which can ultimately lead to their death. Newell's shearwater fledglings can be dazed and disoriented by intense lighting in the night, which can lead to an unfortunate ending for the young birds because they can be killed by cars or prey animals. Artificial light is about two hundred times more bright than natural illumination experienced in the raw environment.

References 

Hawaii
Environment of Hawaii